John Henry Nash (December 1867 – 21 April 1939) was an English footballer who played as a forward for Burslem Port Vale in the 1890s.

Career
Nash most likely joined Burslem Port Vale in the autumn of 1890. His debut is believed to have come in a friendly at Middlesbrough Ironopolis on 22 November 1890; Vale lost 6–1 with Nash scoring the Vale goal. He hardly played thereafter and was released at the end of the 1892–93 season with 13 appearances (including two in the Second Division of the English Football League and six in the Midland Football League) and two goals (including in one Midland League) to his name.

Career statistics
Source:

References

1867 births
1939 deaths
Sportspeople from Burslem
English footballers
Association football forwards
Port Vale F.C. players
Midland Football League players
English Football League players